Raleigh, the second largest city in North Carolina, is home to more than 50 completed high-rise buildings, 14 of which stand taller than at least  and 22 which stand taller than at least 200 ft. It also stands as the tallest building in the state of North Carolina outside Charlotte. The second-tallest skyscraper in the city is Two Hannover Square, which rises  and was completed in 1991. The Wells Fargo Capitol Center, completed in 1990, is Raleigh's third tallest building, rising at 400 feet (122 m). Overall, of the 25 tallest buildings in North Carolina, three are located in Raleigh.
The history of skyscrapers in Raleigh began with the completion of the North Carolina State Capital in 1840.



Tallest buildings

This list ranks Raleigh skyscrapers, based on standard height measurement. This includes spires and architectural details but does not include antenna masts. The "Year" column indicates the year in which a building was completed.

Tallest Under Construction

Buildings approved that are currently under construction, in site prep, or demolition phase. Buildings listed are planned to rise above  and include:

Tallest Proposed, Approved & Pending Construction 

Buildings currently planned, approved or on hold. Buildings listed are planned to rise above 200 feet (60 m) and include:

Timeline of tallest buildings

This lists buildings that once held the title of tallest building in Raleigh.

See also
 List of tallest buildings in North Carolina
 List of tallest buildings in Charlotte, North Carolina
 List of tallest buildings in Winston-Salem

References

External links
 Raleigh
 Raleigh Skyscraper Diagram

Raleigh
 
Tallest in Raleigh